Muhammad Nazir (born 19 May 1936) is a Pakistani wrestler. He competed in the men's freestyle featherweight at the 1956 Summer Olympics.

References

External links
 

1936 births
Living people
Pakistani male sport wrestlers
Olympic wrestlers of Pakistan
Wrestlers at the 1956 Summer Olympics
Place of birth missing (living people)
Commonwealth Games medallists in wrestling
Commonwealth Games gold medallists for Pakistan
Commonwealth Games silver medallists for Pakistan
Wrestlers at the 1966 British Empire and Commonwealth Games
Wrestlers at the 1970 British Commonwealth Games
20th-century Pakistani people
Medallists at the 1966 British Empire and Commonwealth Games
Medallists at the 1970 British Commonwealth Games